Birol Pekel (1938 in Kadıköy, İstanbul – 7 February 2004 in Kadıköy, İstanbul) was a Turkish football player of rivals Beşiktaş J.K. and Fenerbahçe. He played as a forward.

He started his professional career with Beylerbeyi S.K. and then transferred to Beşiktaş J.K. where he played four years between 1959-63. Then he transferred to Fenerbahçe S.K. with his teammate Şenol Birol. He played with Fenerbahçe between 1963–68 and scored 24 goals in 154 matches.

He played 9 matches for national team.

He is famous about Şenol-Birol Goal slogan.

References

1938 births
2004 deaths
Footballers from Istanbul
Turkey international footballers
Beşiktaş J.K. footballers
Fenerbahçe S.K. footballers
Turkey youth international footballers
Association football forwards
Turkish football managers